Easy Star Records is an American independent record label founded in 1996. Based in New York City, the label primarily produces and releases albums in the genres of reggae and dub.

The label has had multiple albums chart at No. 1 on the Billboard Top Reggae Albums chart, including Easy Star's Lonely Hearts Dub Band, two albums by The Green, and Vines by Passafire, who signed to the label in 2013.
In 2014 the label released albums by Rebelution, Giant Panda Guerilla Dub Squad, Backbeat Soundsystem, New Kingston, and The Expanders, whose June 2015 album Hustling Culture debuted at No. 1 on the Top Reggae Albums chart. Since 2015, the label has released albums by London-based quartet The Skints, Jamaican vocalists Jesse Royal and Protoje, among others. Falling Into Place by Rebelution and A Matter Of Time by Protoje, released via Easy Star Records, each received Grammy Award nominations for Best Reggae Album in 2016 and 2018 respectively. The label also manages bands such as the Easy Star All-Stars, a touring and recording musical collective, and has worked with artists outside the reggae genre such as Citizen Cope, Corey Harris, Janelle Monáe, Jason Mraz, Kelly Clarkson, and Yoko Ono.

History
Easy Star Records was founded in 1996  by friends; Michael Goldwasser, Eric Smith, Lem Oppenheimer and Remy Gerstein, in NYC.

Despite coming from various backgrounds and interests, the founders shared a love for live dancehall and Jamaican reggae.

As depicted by United Reggae, the founders "felt there was a place for roots reggae made with live musicians and analog equipment, like it had been back in the 70’s and early 80’s". The inspiration for the label's name came from the "Jamaican patois salutation, ‘Easy, Star,’ as in 'Take it easy, Star.'" 

At the time, Goldwasser was working as a musician, while Oppenheimer, a DJ, had recently moved to New York after graduating from Oberlin College in Ohio. Eric Smith, a native New Yorker, studied political science and sociology at SUNY Albany, while maintaining his interest in live reggae and vinyl. He was also working as a news assistant on The New York Times’ Metro desk.

Without any previous experience; Eric, Lem, Michael, and Remy gathered most of their savings -equating to about $5,000 per person, to start Easy Star Records. Eric states, "We had to start from scratch, but we methodically learned everything we could. We focused on the challenges at hand, rather than becoming overwhelmed by the scope of starting a business.” 

In 1997 Lem Oppenheimer moved to Charlottesville, Virginia, but stayed connected with the label, serving as an executive from a distance.

Founding Easy Star All-Stars 

Michael Goldwasser, already a musician in the New York City reggae scene, brought together a number of musicians to work on original music that he had been working on. Goldwasser stated, "We wanted to be an original Jamaican reggae label, although not run by Jamaicans."

The label shortly started working with artists and producers with unreleased material mostly from the 1970s and 1980s and began reissuing tracks as well. The New York reggae and dub collective, Easy Star All-Stars, was then formed by the label co-founders in 1997. With a rotating roster of musicians, the band originally functioned as a studio band for the label's earliest recordings, however only beginning to tour in 2003.  Early on, the Easy Star All-Stars would play around New York City backing up Jamaican artists, including Sugar Minott and Johnny Osbourne. The band also put on tribute shows to artists such as Augustus Pablo, Dennis Brown, and Jackie Mittoo. To note, not all of the co-founders were musically involved in the band; Oppenheimer, for example, remained VP of the label and not a touring member.
Michael Goldwasser serves as the group's original composer and "unofficial creative director," playing various instruments on their releases and writing the adaptations before the band goes on tour.

1997–2002: Easy Star Records' Early releases

Easy Star Records released several singles on 7" vinyl, including "Time Has Come," the first single by Ossie Dellimore, in 1997. Dellimore, a roots reggae singer based in Brooklyn, performed locally for several years before recording with the Easy Star All-Stars.

After 1997, the label ceased releasing singles, instead focusing on EPs and LPs. In January 1998, Easy Star Records released its first compilation, Easy Star Volume One, which included covers by the Easy Star All-Stars and guest  performers such as MC Trouble, Rob Symeonn, Gary Pine, Sister Carol, Sluggy Ranks, Ranking Joe, The Meditations, and Sugar Minott.

Among the songs were Dellimore's previous single, "Time Has Come," and other singles the label already released on 7".

AllMusic called the album an "exceptionally good collection of reggae singles...Although all of the tracks benefit from state-of-the-art production technology, the singing and playing are all reminiscent of the late '70s and early '80s, the period when Rastafarian-themed roots reggae was ceding ground to the slicker and more secular dancehall styles." Also giving it 4/5 stars with a positive review.

Regarding the album's production, "The prime mover behind this album is producer Michael G, who provides all the rhythms and a virtuosic touch at the mixing board."

1999–2002

On February 9, 1999, Easy Star Records came out with Ghetto Knowledge by The Meditations, a reggae vocal harmony group from Jamaica and the second release on the label. AllMusic describes Ghetto Knowledge as "a match made in heaven: the Meditations, a roots harmony trio that has maintained the same style and lineup since the early 1970s, and Easy Star Records, a label devoted to releasing modern roots reggae that partakes of the spirit and flavor of reggae's classical period while taking advantage of 21st century recording technology."

Almost nine months later, the label released Sugar Minott's compilation album, Hidden Treasures Vol. 1.

In 2000, the label started releasing 7" vinyl again, with over ten singles alone in that year by artists including singer Luciano, Jamaican deejays Anthony B and Triston Palma, and The Meditations. The label also released three full-length albums that year, with the first being the March reissue of Ghetto-ology, a 1979 album by singer and producer Sugar Minott. In October of that year, the label released Sugar Minott's compilation, Hidden Treasures Vol. 2, followed in November by Jamaican deejay Tristan Palma's album, Two Roads.

In February 2001, the label saw the release of All I Have Is Love; a compilation album and the label's seventh release. The original album included artist record remakes of classic Studio One songs produced by Sister Carol. It was received positively by critics such as Stephen Cook of AllMusic, who called it "successful look back at the music before the digital hegemony of dancehall and ragga."

In August 2001, Sugar Minott released Rare Gems, his second release on Easy Star Records. Want Some Freedom by The African Brothers was then released in September 2001, with only two albums released in 2002: Easy Star Vol. 2 Dancehall Culture, and the compilation album Can't Stop Us Now.

2003: Dub Side of the Moon
Several years after Can't Stop Us Now, the label released one album annually. On February 18, 2003, the Easy Star All-Stars released Dub Side of the Moon, a reggae reinterpretation of Pink Floyd's classic The Dark Side of the Moon. Dollarman, Corey Harris, Frankie Paul, The Meditations, and Ranking Joe were among the performers. The Easy Star All-Stars "hit the ground running in 2003 with the Pink Floyd tribute Dub Side Of The Moon, [and] ...followed that up with regular three-year installments: first came Radiodread, a spacious tip of the hat to Radiohead's OK Computer, before Easy Star's Lonely Hearts Dub Band and Easy Star's Thrillah – a Jamaican-infused take on Michael Jackson's world sales-record album. AllMusic gave Dub Side of the Moon a positive review, stating "dub's psychedelic mysticism is a perfectly good match for Pink Floyd's mannered weirdness." Dub Side of the Moon stayed on the Billboard Reggae Charts for several years after its release in 2003. 
After its release. there was "a great demand for live renditions of the album all over the world," and the label put together a touring group which has been on the road since 2003. 
The Easy Star All-Stars were also coined as the trendsetter for cover albums taking off; the Independent states, "The concept only began to take off in the early Noughties, thanks partly to the genius of New York-based reggae outfit The Easy Star All Stars, who have recorded some of the most accomplished and inspired cover albums." 
Despite the frequent pop song covers, Easy Star co-founder and executive producer Eric Smith has stated "There is a lot of suffering and pain in reggae. It's a struggler's, it's a sufferer's music. The casual fan sees reggae as a summer, spring-break-type music, and that's really far from what it's about. We like some of the darker areas of reggae, and one of our concerns with combining [reggae and Dark Side of the Moon], was we'd have a really, really dark album on our hands."

2005–2008: EPs

The label had no releases in 2003 or 2004. The label's next release was in April 2005, the album Pressure Points by American reggae band, John Brown's Body. In August 2006, Easy Star All-Stars released their song-by-song cover of Radiohead's OK Computer named Radiodread. Thom Yorke praised Toots & The Maytals version of "Let Down" on Radiodread, and Radiohead guitarist Jonny Greenwood also praised the cover version, calling it "truly astounding." Easy Star All-Stars member, Ticklah, released a solo album, Ticklah vs. Axelrod in late 2007.  Unlike their previous albums, this album consists of mostly non-cover material, except for "Dubbing Up the Walls," a cover of the Radiohead song "Climbing Up the Walls."

Marketing and events
The label previously organized Easy Star Reggae Tuesdays, a long-running reggae party in New York. The label has consulted on marketing for albums such as Mighty High (2007) by Southern jam band Gov't Mule.[1] The label has also been involved in consulting with SOJA, a Virginia reggae band signed to ATO Records.

2009: Tours and charting albums
The label released five albums in 2009;[16] John Brown's Body, Amplify, debuted at #1 on Billboard's reggae charts. The band's remix EP Re-Amplify also debuted on the Reggae Albums chart, peaking at #8. This album featured remixes by artists from around the world including; Dubmatix (Toronto), WrongTom (London) and Disashi Lumumba Kasongo from Gym Class Heroes (US). Easy Star All-Stars released Easy Star's Lonely Hearts Dub Band, a reggae cover of The Beatles' Sgt. Pepper's Lonely Hearts Club Band. Music Feeds rated the album 10/10, it made the Billboard Top 200 twice and the first reggae album to do so in over two years. It also reached #1 on Top Reggae Albums, #2 on Top Heatseekers, and #9 on the Top Independent Albums.

Later in 2009, the label also reissued the 2008 album Solid Ground, its first album by New Zealand reggae band, The Black Seeds. This album was the band's first US release
and also reached platinum status in New Zealand, and #15 on the US Billboard Reggae Charts. The Black Seeds toured America supporting John Brown's Body, before John Brown's Body came to New Zealand to tour with The Black Seeds.

This tour lead to a musical brotherhood with The Black Seeds and they and John Brown's Body performed together at the 2010 Grassroots Music Festival in Ithaca, NY. The label also released The Prester John Sessions, a solo album by Tommy T, the Ethiopian bassist for the band Gogol Bordello.

2010–2013
Easy Star Records released three records in late 2010, including Connection by American vocalist Cas Haley that debuted at #2 on Billboard's Top 200 Best Selling Reggae Albums.  a second album by The Black Seeds, and the remix album, Dubber Side of the Moon by Easy Star All-Stars that debuted at #2 on the Billboard Reggae charts. 2011 marked the first time in almost a decade that the label released a 7" vinyl single: "Pork Eater" by Ticklah, a 2007 track that first appeared on his album Ticklah vs. Axelrod. "Pork Eater" was followed by the single "Don't Stop the Music" by the Easy Star All-Stars. In 2011, the label also released the first original album by the Easy Star All-Stars: First Light. Cas Haley also released another EP. This year, the label signed The Green, a reggae band formed in 2009 in Oahu, Hawaii known for blending Hawaiian music with roots reggae. The band released an LP and EP that year and in May 2011 the LP Ways & Means spent four weeks at #1 on Billboard's Reggae Chart, also winning "Best Reggae Album" at Hawaii's Na Hoku Hanohano Awards In April, 2012 The Black Seeds, a New Zealand-based reggae band, released their albums in the United States for the first time. The new LP Dust and Dirt and four older albums including Into The Dojo were among them. In 2012, the Easy Star All-Stars, released cover album Easy Star's Thrillah, themed to Michael Jackson, and the album JBB in DUB by America Reggae band, John Brown's Body.

2013–2015
John Brown's Body released Kings & Queens in early 2013, followed by Cas Haley's La Si Dah  and The Green's Hawai'i '13. Easy Star Records also signed Passafire, from Savannah, Georgia, known for infusing rock with reggae, dub, and progressive elements in their music. Their album, Vines, was released that fall, also marking the label's fortieth release. Kings and Queens, Hawai'i '13, and Vines, all reached #1 on the Billboard Top Reggae Albums chart that year. Count Me In by Rebelution, was released on June 10, 2014,[3]  debuting at #14 on the Billboard 200. Easy Star All-Stars released Dub Side of the Moon: Special Anniversary Edition on September 16, 2014. The band Giant Panda Guerilla Dub Squad released Steady on September 30, 2014, with the album receiving a near perfect 4.5/5 score from The Pier. Backbeat Soundsystem released the album Together Not Apart on October 14, 2014. In November 2014, the New York band New Kingston signed to the label to release their album Kingston City, which came out on January 27, 2015. The Expanders' June 2015 album Hustling Culture on Easy Star debuted at #1 on the Top Reggae Albums chart.

 2016-2019 
In summer 2016, Rebelution released Falling Into Place, their second full-length album via Easy Star Records. Falling Into Place, Rebelution's 6th studio album, debuted at #1 on Billboard's Top Reggae Albums chart, #3 on Billboard's Top Independent Albums chart, and #32 on the Billboard 200. Later that year Easy Star Records put out Live at Red Rocks by Rebelution, which also debuted #1 on Billboard's Top Reggae Albums chart. In September 2016, John Brown's Body released Fireflies, the band's 12th studio album and 7th with Easy Star Records. Fireflies also achieved the #1 spot on Billboard's Top Reggae Albums chart. In 2016, Easy Star Records also released Backbeat Soundystem's Into The Light EP, and The Big Smoke Remixed by Gentleman's Dub Club.

In 2017, Easy Star Records released 9 albums. Lily of da Valley by Jesse Royal, Old Time Something Come Back Again, Vol. 2 by The Expanders, and Marching Orders by The Green each reached the #1 spot on Billboard's Top Reggae Albums chart. Other Easy Star Records releases in 2017 included Dubtopia by Gentleman's Dub Club, Longshot by Passafire, Sharp & Ready by Double Tiger, A Kingston Story: Come from Far by New Kingston, Fabric by The Black Seeds, and Victor Rice's Smoke.

In 2018, Easy Star Records released Free Rein by Rebelution and A Matter Of Time by Protoje, both of which reached #1 on the Billboard's Top Reggae Albums Chart. Protoje's A Matter Of Time also received a Grammy nomination for Best Reggae Album. In 2019, Easy Star Records released new albums from Gentleman's Dub Club, The Green, The Skints, Spragga Benz, Bedouin Soundclash. In tandem with Winta James' Overstand Entertainment, the label also released Fight The Fight, the debut EP from Mortimer.

 2020 
Easy Star released albums from Rebelution, Unified Highway, Victor Rice, The Skints, and Double Tiger in 2020. The label also introduced the debut album, Underrated, from Jamaican trap and "grimehall" artist Fyah Roiall. Additionally, Easy Star released the Lately EP from Hawaii-bred, California-based trio The Late Ones, and Star Chile EP with tracks featuring Lutan Fyah, Pressure Busspipe, and Alandon over a riddim produced by Digital Ancient. On March 13, 2020, Easy Star released the hit single "Natty Pablo" by Jesse Royal, and a corresponding music video on April 10, 2020. The label also released several other singles from artists such as The Expanders, The Steppas, Backbeat Soundsystem, Indubious, Bedouin Soundclash, Gentleman's Dub Club, The Skints, The Black Seeds and Fyah Roiall. 

 2021-2023 
Between 2021 and 2023, Easy Star has released albums from Gentleman's Dub Club, Indubious, Rebelution, The Late Ones, Marcus Gad and Tamal, Groundation, JonQuan and Associates, Kirsty Rock, The Black Seeds, and Sundub. In 2021, the label released an album from Jesse Royal, titled Royal, which was nominated for a Grammy.'' In 2023, Easy Star Records' "Starman" cover with Maxi Priest, a reggae interpretation of the popular David Bowie tune, earned an article and feature in Rolling Stone magazine.  The label also released a number of singles under its various artists.

DiscographyAlbumsList of Easy Star Records albumsSinglesIncomplete list of Easy Star Records singlesDVDs'''

References

 
American independent record labels
Record labels established in 1996